Yao Cuan (born 6 June 1997) is a Chinese Paralympic swimmer. She represented China at the Summer Paralympics.

Career
Cuan made her international debut for China at the 2016 Summer Paralympics. She represented China in the women's 100 metre breaststroke SB4 event at the 2020 Summer Paralympics and won a bronze medal.

References

1997 births
Living people
Paralympic swimmers of China
Chinese female breaststroke swimmers
Chinese female freestyle swimmers
People from Cixi
S5-classified Paralympic swimmers
Medalists at the World Para Swimming Championships
Swimmers at the 2016 Summer Paralympics
Swimmers at the 2020 Summer Paralympics
Medalists at the 2020 Summer Paralympics
Paralympic silver medalists for China
Paralympic medalists in swimming
21st-century Chinese women